Sathi Ahalya is a 1937 Indian, Tamil language film directed by T. R. Sundaram. The film featured K. Thavamani Devi as Ahalya in her debut role.

Plot
The film depicts the story of Ahalya, wife of Gautama Maharishi, as told in Hindu mythology. Ahalya was turned into a stone by her husband as she was said to be unfaithful to him. However, she gets back to her own self when Rama's feet touches the stone.

Cast
Cast according to the film's song book
 K. Thavamani Devi as Ahalikai (Ahalya) 
 T. M. Shankar as Indran 
 S. D. Subbaiah as Naradar
 S. V. Dhathachar as Gauthamar
 S. N. Sivakozhundu as Vishwamitrar
 T. R. Thulasi Bai as Indrani
 S. L. Venkitanarayana Iyengar as Comedian
 S. S. Sakunthala as Comedian
 Venu Bai, Rathnam, Jeevarathnam.

Production
This is the first film produced by Modern Theatres shot in their own studios. 117 films were made in this studio from 1937 till 1982 including the first full-length Tamil colour film Alibabavum 40 Thirudargalum (1956 film).

Soundtrack
R. Balusami composed the music while the lyrics were penned by Baskaradas

References

Hindu mythological films
Films directed by T. R. Sundaram
Films based on the Ramayana
Indian black-and-white films